Christian Wenaweser is a Liechtenstein diplomat.

Education
Wenaweser was educated at the University of Zurich, the Graduate Institute of International Studies in Geneva, and the Bavarian Academy of Sciences and Humanities in Munich, Germany.

Career
Since 2002, Wenaweser has been the Permanent Representative of Liechtenstein to the United Nations. In this capacity, he has been particularly active in developing the International Criminal Court (ICC) further.

Within the Assembly of States Parties of the ICC, Wenaweser chaired the Special Working Group on the Crime of Aggression from 2003 and 2009. In 2008, he was elected to a three-year term as the president of the Assembly of States Parties. In this position, he succeeded Bruno Stagno Ugarte of Costa Rica. In December 2011, he was succeeded as the President of the Assembly by Tiina Intelmann.

Between 2003 and 2005 Wenaweser also served as Chairman of the ad hoc Committee on the Scope of Legal Protection under the Convention on the Safety of United Nations and Associated Personnel From 2004 until 2005, he was Vice-Chair of the Open-Ended Working Group on Security Council Reform.

Other activities
 All Survivors Project, Member of the Board of Advisors
 Dag Hammarskjöld Fund for Journalists, Member of the Honorary Advisory Council
 International Center for Transitional Justice (ICTJ), Member of the Advisory Board
 International Gender Champions (IGC), Member
 International Peace Institute (IPI), Member of the International Advisory Council

References

External links
Permanent Mission of Liechtenstein to the United Nations, New York

Liechtenstein diplomats
University of Zurich alumni
Graduate Institute of International and Development Studies alumni
Presidents of the Assembly of States Parties of the International Criminal Court
Permanent Representatives of Liechtenstein to the United Nations
Living people
Year of birth missing (living people)